Marko Zoćević (born 19 May 1993) is a Serbian professional footballer who plays as a midfielder for Montenegrin club Sutjeska Nikšić.

Career

FC AGMK Olmaliq
After leaving FK Voždovac, Zoćević signed with FC AGMK Olmaiq in Uzbekistan.

Honours
Borac Čačak
 Serbian Cup: Runner-up 2011–12

References

External links
 Srbijafudbal profile
 
 

Association football midfielders
Serbian footballers
Serbian expatriate footballers
Sportspeople from Čačak
1993 births
Living people
FC AGMK players
FK Voždovac players
FK Borac Čačak players
FK Mladost Lučani players
FK Vojvodina players
FK Metalac Gornji Milanovac players
FK Sutjeska Nikšić players
Serbian SuperLiga players
Serbian First League players
Montenegrin First League players
Serbian expatriate sportspeople in Uzbekistan
Expatriate footballers in Uzbekistan
Serbian expatriate sportspeople in Montenegro
Expatriate footballers in Montenegro